Chirileni is a village in Ungheni District, Moldova. According to the census from 2014 there was a total population of 1,747 people living in this village. Of this population, 91.80% are ethnic Romanians and 8.20% ethnic Romani.

References

Villages of Ungheni District